Vakhsh Range is a mountain range in Tajikistan, forming the north-west border of Khatlon Province with the Region of Republican Subordination. It stretches for a length of about 80 km along the left bank in the middle course of the Vakhsh River. Composed of sandstone, limestone, and clay. Semidesert and subtropical steppe. Ваш это тавилдара Kyzylsu River rises on its southern slopes.

Mountain ranges of Tajikistan